Lezo is a town located in the province of Gipuzkoa, in the autonomous community of Basque Country, northern Spain.

Municipalities in Gipuzkoa